The Valley City Eagle Bridges is a set of bridges that carry Interstate 72 and U.S. Route 36 across the Illinois River. The bridge is located near Valley City, Illinois, the smallest municipality in the state.

Description
The bridges are post tensioned cast-in-place concrete box girder bridges.
Each bridge has two lanes of travel on a 39-foot deck. The bridge has roughly 7,500 travelers per day.

History
The bridges were completed in 1988. The highway was not completed until 1992, when Highway 36 was rerouted onto I-72 and the older Florence Bridge began carrying Illinois Routes 100 and 106.

See also
 
 
 
 List of crossings of the Illinois River

References 

Bridges completed in 1988
Bridges over the Illinois River
Bridges in Pike County, Illinois
Buildings and structures in Scott County, Illinois
U.S. Route 36
Road bridges in Illinois
Interstate 72
Bridges on the Interstate Highway System
Bridges of the United States Numbered Highway System
Concrete bridges in the United States
Box girder bridges in the United States